Menorcan Union (UMe) was a regional liberal party in Menorca. It was registered as a party since 1993. However, until 2009 it did not start its political activity. It gathered people from different municipal parties in Menorca, like Independents for Es Castell (IPEC), Union of Centrists of Menorca (UCM), and Social Action.

UMe joined Majorcan Union (UM) in the Balearic Islands to participate in the 2009 European election with the Coalition for Europe, obtaining 546 votes (2.5%) in Menorca. In the 2011 local election, the formation obtained four local councillors in Menorca.

In 2012, it merged into the new balearic regionalist formation Proposta per les Illes, along with Regionalist League of the Balearic Islands (IB–Lliga), Convergence for the Isles (CxI), and Es Nou Partit.

Electoral performance

Parliament of the Balearic Islands

European Parliament

 * Within Coalition for Europe.
 ** In coalition with Majorcan Union.

References

Centrist parties in Spain
Defunct liberal political parties
Political parties in the Balearic Islands
Regionalist parties in Spain
1982 establishments in Spain